Seeking Refuge is the third and last album to date by Excel. It was released in 1995. Some of the material on this album dates back to 1991 when Excel began writing The Joke's on Yous follow-up. Due to lineup changes and band members being involved in their own activities at the time, Seeking Refuge was set aside for a number of years before finally being completed in 1995. With this album, Excel once again presented a change in musical style, from the pure thrash of The Joke's on You to a more stoner/groove metal sound.

Like other Excel albums, the album is out of print. The only single off this album was "Unenslaved".

Track listing
 "Unenslaved"
 "Hair Like Christ"
 "Plastic Cracks"
 "Take Your Part Gotta Encourage"
 "Drowned Out"
 "United Naturally in True Youth"
 "Riptide"
 "Overview"
 "Downpressor"

Personnel
 Dan Clements - vocals
 Brandon Rudley - guitar
 Shaun Ross - bass
 Max - drums

Delicious Vinyl albums
Excel (band) albums
1995 albums